Santosh Saroj is a Bollywood screenwriter and dialogue writer mostly known for films like 'Agneepath','Major Saab'.His last film as writer was Sirf, released in 2008.He was also assistant director for films like 'Mausam','Raaste Ka Patthar' He has also directed two films "Waqt Waqt ki Baat" & "Pyar Mein Sauda Nahin"  .

Filmography
Kaalia - Screenplay - 1981
Bulundi - Screenplay- 1981
Pyar Mein Sauda Nahin - Screenplay - 1982
Waqt Waqt ki Baat - Story & Screenplay - 1982
Naam O Nishaan-Screenplay -1987
Shahenshah-Screenplay-1988
Ek Hi Maqsad-Screenplay & Dialogue-1988
Agneepath-Story & Screenplay-1990
Aaj Ka Arjun - Screenplay - 1990
Doodh Ka Karz-Story & Screenplay-1990
Izzat - Screenplay and Dialogues - 1991
Gunehgaar Kaun-Story, Screenplay, Dialogues-1991
Khuda Gawah-Story, Screenplay, Dialogues-1992
Police Officer - Story, Screenplay and Dialogues - 1992
Phool Aur Angaar - Story, Screenplay and Dialogues - 1993
Krishna Avtaar - Story, Screenplay and Dialogues - 1993
Aadmi-Sreenplay & Dialogue-1993
Jai Kishen - Screenplay & Dialogue - 1994
Kranti Kshetra-Story, Screenplay and Dialogues-1994
Insaaf Apne Lahoo Sey-Screenplay-1994
Aa Gale Lag Jaa-Story, Screenplay, Dialogues -1994
Baazi - Dialogue - 1995
Vijeta-Screenplay and Dialogues-1996
Jung-Story, Screenplay, Dialogues-1996
Krishna- Screenplay & Dialogues-1996
Daanveer-Story, Screenplay, Dialogues-1996
Raja Ki Aayegi Baaraat - Story, Screenplay and Dialogues - 1996
Major Saab-Screenplay and Dialogues-1998
Gair-Dialogues-1999
Krodh-Screenplay-2000
Badal-Dialogues-2000
Beti No 1-Story, Screenplay, Dialogues-2000
Ek Hindustani-Story, Screenplay, Dialogues-2003
Sirf..Life looks greener-Dialogues-2008

Personal life
His collaboration with Mukul Anand was most successful, Films like Agneepath & Khuda Gawah. He wrote for Tinu Anand, Film's Like Kaalia, Shahenshah & Major Saab .Santosh Saroj is mostly known for Agneepath(1990).

External links
 

Indian male screenwriters
Hindi-language film directors
Living people
20th-century Indian dramatists and playwrights
20th-century Indian male writers
Year of birth missing (living people)